Catalonian Nights Vol. 1 is a live album by pianist Tete Montoliu recorded in Spain in 1980 and released on the Danish label, SteepleChase.

Reception

Scott Yanow of AllMusic said "Although not an innovator, Montoliu (like Oscar Peterson, whose phenomenal technique he approached) was a master of the modern mainstream and of chordal improvisation. He digs into these songs and comes up with consistently fresh and swinging ideas".

Track listing
 "D & E" (Milt Jackson) – 14:03
 "Lady Bird" (Tadd Dameron) – 7:25
 "Jo Vull Que M'Acariciis" (Tete Montoliu) – 11:46 Bonus track on CD	
 "Autumn in New York" (Vernon Duke) – 13:22
 "Blue Bossa" (Kenny Dorham) – 8:14
 "Theme" (Montoliu) – 0:29

Personnel
Tete Montoliu – piano
John Heard – bass
Albert Heath – drums

References

Tete Montoliu live albums
1981 live albums
SteepleChase Records live albums